Dunedin Stadium may refer to:

 Dunedin Stadium (Florida), formerly known as Knology Park and Florida Auto Exchange Stadium, a baseball stadium in Dunedin, Florida, US
 Dunedin Ice Stadium, formerly Dunedin Stadium, an ice rink in St Kilda, New Zealand
 Forsyth Barr Stadium at University Plaza, known in its planning stages as Dunedin Stadium, a rugby stadium in Dunedin, New Zealand